The 2018–19 Mumbai City FC season was the club's fifth season since its establishment in 2014 and their fifth season in the Indian Super League.

Pre-season and friendlies
On 31 August 2018, Mumbai City started their pre season in Thailand. They played with local clubs Chiangmai FC, Lampang F.C., Maejo United F.C. and Bangkok United F.C.

Players

Current squad

Foreign players

The number of foreign players allowed in the squad will be reduced from eight to seven from 2018 to 2019 season, however the maximum number of foreign players allowed on the pitch will remain same at five.

Competitions

Indian Super League

League table

Indian Super Cup

References

Mumbai City FC seasons
Mumbai City